The Netherlands Football League Championship 1938–1939 was contested by 51 teams participating in five divisions. The national champion would be determined by a play-off featuring the winners of the eastern, northern, southern and two western football divisions of the Netherlands. AFC Ajax won this year's championship by beating DWS, NEC, FC Eindhoven and Achilles 1894.

New entrants
Eerste Klasse East:
Promoted from 2nd Division: Quick Nijmegen
Eerste Klasse North:
Promoted from 2nd Division: FVC
Eerste Klasse West-I:
Moving in from West-II: Blauw-Wit Amsterdam, HVV 't Gooi, HBS Craeyenhout, Hermes DVS, Stormvogels and Xerxes
Eerste Klasse West-II:
Moving in from West-I: AFC Ajax, DFC, RFC, VSV, VUC
Promoted from 2nd Division: DOS

Divisions

Eerste Klasse East

Eerste Klasse North

Eerste Klasse South

Eerste Klasse West-I

Eerste Klasse West-II

Championship play-off

References
RSSSF Netherlands Football League Championships 1898-1954
RSSSF Eerste Klasse Oost
RSSSF Eerste Klasse Noord
RSSSF Eerste Klasse Zuid
RSSSF Eerste Klasse West
Results of all matches on EU-FOOTBALL.INFO

Netherlands Football League Championship seasons
Neth
Neth